Metamorphosis is a biological process by which an animal physically develops after birth.

Metamorphosis may also refer to:

 Metamorphism, a geological process
 Metamorphosis (illusion), a stage illusion invented by John Nevil Maskelyne
 Shapeshifting, a common theme in mythology, folklore and other fiction

Literature and art

the Transfiguration of Jesus is called the metamorphosis in Greek, and often in English in discussing Greek Orthodox theology and art
 The Metamorphosis (play), a 1783 play by the Irish writer William Jackson
 The Metamorphosis, a 1915 novella by Franz Kafka
 The Metamorphosis, a 1969 play by Steven Berkoff adapted from the work by Kafka
 Three woodcut prints by M. C. Escher:
 Metamorphosis I (1937)
 Metamorphosis II (1939/40)
 Metamorphosis III (1967/68)
 Metamorphosis (Miró), a series of collage-drawings by Joan Miró, made between 1935 and 1936
 Metamorphosis (manga) (also known as Emergence), a 2016 pornographic manga
Metamorphosis : How and Why We Change, 2014 non-fiction book by Polly Morland

Music

Classical 
 Metamorphosis-Symphonies, three symphonies by Martin Scherber
 Metamorphosis, a piece for piano by Philip Glass
 Metamorphosen, a composition for 23 solo strings by Richard Strauss
 Metamorphosen, the subtitle of Violin Concerto No. 2, a composition by Krzysztof Penderecki

Albums 
 Metamorphosis (Arthur Blythe album)
 Metamorphosis (Circle of Dust album)
 Metamorphosis (Culture Beat album)
 Metamorphosis (Don Friedman album)
 Metamorphosis (Hilary Duff album)
 Metamorphosis (Iron Butterfly album)
 Metamorphosis (Mercenary album)
 Metamorphosis (Papa Roach album)
 Metamorphosis (Pillar album)
 Metamorphosis (The Rolling Stones album)
 Metamorphosis (Wade Marcus album)
 Metamorphosis (World Saxophone Quartet album)
 Metamorphosis (Yeng Constantino album)
 Metamorphosis (Yolanda Soares album)
 Metamorphosis (Zero Hour album)
 Metamorphosis (EP), by Ulver
 Metamorphosis, by J.R.
 Metamorphosis, by Magenta

Songs 
 "Metamorphosis", a song by Coroner from Mental Vortex
 "Metamorphosis", a song by Northlane from Discoveries
 "Metamorphosis", a song by Pet Shop Boys from Bilingual
 "M3tamorphosis", a song by Playboi Carti from Whole Lotta Red
 "Metamorphosis", a theme from the music of Final Fantasy VI
 "Metamorphose" (Shizuka Kudo song)

Visual media

Film 
 Metamorphosis (1975 film), a student film by Barry Greenwald, winner of the Short Film Palme d'Or
 Metamorphosis (1987 film), a 1987 TV movie adaptation of the Kafka story, directed by Jim Goddard
 Metamorphosis (1990 Italian film), a 1990 Italian science fiction horror movie by George Eastman
 Metamorphosis: The Alien Factor, a 1990 science fiction horror movie by Glenn Takajian
 Metamorphosis (2012 film), a 2012 film adaptation of Kafka's work of the same name
 Metamorphosis (2019 South Korean film), a film starring Bae Seong-woo
 Metamorphosis (2019 Philippine film), a film starring Gold Azeron

Television 
 "Metamorphosis" (H2O: Just Add Water)
 "Metamorphosis" (Justice League)
 "Metamorphosis" (Sanctuary)
 "Metamorphosis" (Smallville)
 "Metamorphosis" (Star Trek: The Original Series)
 "Metamorphosis" (Star Wars)
 "Metamorphosis" (Stargate SG-1)
 "Metamorphosis" (Supernatural)
 "The Metamorphosis" (The O.C.)
 Metamorphosis (TV series), a 2007 Singaporean action thriller drama

Video games 
 Metamorphosis (video game), a 2020 adventure game by Ovid Works published by All in! Games

See also 
 Metamorfosi (disambiguation)
 Metamorfosis (disambiguation)
 Metamorphism (disambiguation)
 Metamorphoses (disambiguation)
 Métamorphose (disambiguation)